Isis River may refer to:

 Isis River (New South Wales), a tributary of Pages River, Australia
Isis River, Queensland, a locality in the Bundaberg Region
 Isis River (Queensland), a tributary of Gregory River, Australia
 Isis River (Tasmania), a tributary of Macquarie River, Tasmania, Australia

See also
 The Isis, a river in England
 Isis (disambiguation)